= Los Angeles Museum =

Los Angeles Museum may refer to:

- Natural History Museum of Los Angeles County, established 1913
- Los Angeles County Museum of Art, forked from the previous in 1961
